The 2009 FIRA tournament acted as the continent's 2010 World Cup qualifying tournament. The top four nations from the 2009 Six Nations had automatically qualified, but nations finishing fifth and sixth (Scotland and Italy) joined Spain, Netherlands, Russia, Sweden, Germany, and Belgium to decide the final two places.

Format 
The teams were divided into two pools, the "seeding" broadly based on FIRA rankings, with the pool winners qualifying:

Seed 1:  Scotland (Pool A)
Seed 2:  Italy (Pool B)
Seed 3:  Spain (Pool B)
Seed 4:  Netherlands (Pool A)
Seed 5:  Russia (Pool A)
Seed 6:  Sweden (Pool B)
Seed 7:  Germany (Pool B)
Seed 8:  Belgium (Pool A)

After the completion of the pool phase, the tournament itself did not have a "final", nor any other classification games.

As expected, Scotland qualified from Pool A with no problems - but it always looked a tougher prospect for fellow Six Nations team Italy, in Pool B, as they would have to beat Spain - something they had never managed before. But when it came to the event neither Italy nor Spain were to qualify, but rather hosts and sixth seeds Sweden, who shocked everyone by first beating Italy and then Spain - in both cases coming from behind in the dying minutes of the game.

Other games in the tournament followed the seedings - and were embarrassingly one-sided in many cases - demonstrating the gulf that continues to exist between the leading eight or nine nations in Europe and the rest.

Pool A

Pool B

Point Scorers

Leading point scorers

Other point scorers
14 points: Ulrika Andersson Hall (Sweden)
10 points: Natalia Alexeeva (Russia), Dorien Eppink (Netherlands), Veronica Fitzpatrick (Scotland), Silvia Peron (Italy), Isabel Rodríguez (Spain), Wikke Tuinhout (Netherlands), Paola Zangirolami(Italy)
8 points: Marina Apfel (Germany)
6 points: Marina Bravo (Spain), Claire Paris (Belgium)
5 points: Sara Barattin (Italy), Martina Barbini (Italy), Jessica Berntsson (Sweden), Marlieke Broer (Netherlands), Lana Blyth (Scotland), Emma Evans (Scotland), Lucia Gai (Italy), Elena Gamova (Russia), Tanya Griffith (Scotland), Sylke Haverkorn (Netherlands), Erin Kerr (Scotland), Madeleine Lahti (Sweden), Rebecka Lind (Sweden), Jennifer Lindholm (Sweden), Alexia Mavroudis (Netherlands), Paula Medín(Spain), Elke van Meer (Netherlands), Louise Moffat (Scotland), Suzi Newton (Scotland), Agurtzane Obregozo (Spain), Silvia Pizzati (Italy), Marta Pocurull (Spain), Aitziber Porras (Spain), Johanna van Rossum (Netherlands), Corinne Sailliez (Belgium), Maria Sanfilippo (Italy), Pien Selbeck (Netherlands), Elena Smirnova (Russia), Laura Steven (Scotland), Olga Sychugova (Russia)
4 points: Erika Andersson (Sweden), Anastasiya Mukharyamova (Russia)
2 points: Louise Dalgliesh (Scotland)

External links
FIRA website

See also
Women's international rugby union

2009
2009 rugby union tournaments for national teams
International rugby union competitions hosted by Sweden
2009 in Swedish sport
2008–09 in European women's rugby union